Kazakhstan participated in and won the Turkvision Song Contest 2014 in Kazan, Tatarstan, Russia. "Izin kórem", performed by Zhanar Dugalova, was selected as the Kazakhstani entry for the contest in a national final.

Background

Kazakhstan had previously participated in the inaugural  contest. Rin'go represented Kazakhstan with the song "Birlikpen alǵa" in Eskişehir, Turkey, placing ninth in the final.

Kazakhstan's participation in the contest was confirmed in July 2014, with Astana TV as the participating broadcaster.

Before Turkvision

National final
The national final consisted of a semi-final held on 15 October 2014, and a final held on 26 October 2014. Submissions opened on 18 September 2014 and closed on 12 October 2014.

Semi-final 
47 entries participated in the semi-final, with 16 selected to participate in the final.

The semi-final jury consisted of five members:
Rinat Gysin – composer, arranger, singer, music producer
Rinat Dumanuly – general producer of Khabar Agency
Aynur Tursynbayeva – TV presenter
Timur Serzhanov – DJ, program director of radio station NS
Altynay Zhorabaeva – singer

Final
The final took place on 26 October 2014 at 20:00 UTC+6 (15:00 CET) in Nur-Sultan (then Astana). The winner was determined by a combination of jury voting and televoting. The sixteen entries competing in the final were as follows:

Artist and song information

Zhanar Dugalova

Zhanar Dugalova (born 17 January 1987) is a Kazakhstani singer, who won the Turkvision Song Contest 2014 representing Kazakhstan with the song "Izin kórem". She is also a former member of Kazakhstani pop group KeshYou. Since August 2014 she has continued her career independently.

Izin kórem
"Izin kórem" is a song by Kazakhstani singer Zhanar Dugalova. The song was composed by Dugalova herself with lyrics written by Rinat Zaitov. The song was the winner of the Turkvision Song Contest 2014, representing Kazakhstan. The lyrics address the history and roots of Kazakhstan.

At Turkvision

Semi-final
Kazakhstan opened the semi-final on 19 November 2014, and placed third in a field of 25 countries with 198 points, thus qualifying for the final.

Final
Kazakhstan performed third in the final on 21 November 2014, placing first in a field of 15 countries with 225 points.

Voting
The results were determined solely by jury voting. Each country was represented by one juror who gave each song, with the exception of their own country's song, between 1 and 10 points. The Kazakhstani juror was Bolat Mazhagulov.

Points awarded to Kazakhstan

Points awarded by Kazakhstan

References

2014
Countries in the Turkvision Song Contest 2014
Turkvision